Aleksandrovsky is a rural locality (a khutor) in Makarovsky Selsoviet Rural Settlement, Kurchatovsky District, Kursk Oblast, Russia. Population:

Geography 
The khutor is located on the Seym River, 66 km from the Russia–Ukraine border, 32 km south-west of Kursk, 7 km north-east of the district center – the town Kurchatov, 14.5 km from the selsoviet center – Makarovka.

 Climate
Aleksandrovsky has a warm-summer humid continental climate (Dfb in the Köppen climate classification).

Transport 
Aleksandrovsky is located 23 km from the federal route  Crimea Highway, 2.5 km from the road of regional importance  (Kursk – Lgov – Rylsk – border with Ukraine), 3 km from the road of intermunicipal significance  (Seym River – Mosolovo – Nizhneye Soskovo), 1.5 km from the road  (38N-575 – Zolotukhino), 4 km from the nearest railway halt 433 km (railway line Lgov I — Kursk).

The rural locality is situated 38.5 km from Kursk Vostochny Airport, 130 km from Belgorod International Airport and 242 km from Voronezh Peter the Great Airport.

References

Notes

Sources

Rural localities in Kurchatovsky District, Kursk Oblast